Alexis Hernán Blanco (born 6 June 1988) is an Argentine association football. He plays as forward for Peruvian Primera División team Sport Boys.

References
 Profile at BDFA 
 

1988 births
Living people
People from Santa Rosa, La Pampa
Argentine footballers
Argentine expatriate footballers
Club Atlético Independiente footballers
Sportivo Italiano footballers
Atlético de Rafaela footballers
San Martín de Tucumán footballers
Deportes La Serena footballers
Santiago Morning footballers
Club Atlético Platense footballers
Club Atlético Acassuso footballers
Ferro Carril Oeste footballers
Club Atlético Alvarado players
Juventud Unida de Gualeguaychú players
Gimnasia y Esgrima de Jujuy footballers
Venados F.C. players
Club Blooming players
Caracas FC players
Universidad Técnica de Cajamarca footballers
Sport Boys footballers
Argentine Primera División players
Primera Nacional players
Primera B Metropolitana players
Torneo Argentino A players
Primera B de Chile players
Chilean Primera División players
Ascenso MX players
Bolivian Primera División players
Venezuelan Primera División players
Association football forwards
Argentine expatriate sportspeople in Chile
Argentine expatriate sportspeople in Bolivia
Argentine expatriate sportspeople in Mexico
Argentine expatriate sportspeople in Venezuela
Expatriate footballers in Chile
Expatriate footballers in Bolivia
Expatriate footballers in Mexico
Expatriate footballers in Venezuela